Stephen L. Buchwald (born 1955) is a U.S. chemist and Camille Dreyfus Professor of Chemistry at MIT. He is known for his involvement in the development of the Buchwald-Hartwig amination and the discovery of the dialkylbiaryl phosphine ligand family for promoting this reaction and related transformations. He was elected as a fellow of the American Academy of Arts and Sciences and as a member of the National Academy of Sciences in 2000 and 2008, respectively.

Early life and education
Stephen Buchwald was born in Bloomington, Indiana. He credits his "young and dynamic" high school chemistry teacher, William Lumbley, for infecting him with his enthusiasm.

In 1977 he received his Sc.B. from Brown University where he worked with Kathlyn A. Parker and David E. Cane as well as Gilbert Stork from Columbia University. In 1982 he received his Ph.D from Harvard University working under Jeremy R. Knowles.

Career
Buchwald was a postdoctoral fellow at Caltech with Robert H. Grubbs. In 1984, he joined MIT faculty as an assistant professor of chemistry. He was promoted to associate professor in 1989 and to Professor in 1993. He was named the Camille Dreyfus Professor in 1997. He has coauthored over 435 accepted academic publications and 47 accepted patents.

He is known for his involvement in the development of the Buchwald-Hartwig amination and the discovery of the dialkylbiaryl phosphine ligand family for promoting this reaction and related transformations. He was elected as a fellow of the American Academy of Arts and Sciences and as a member of the National Academy of Sciences in 2000 and 2008, respectively. 
, he served as an associate editor for the academic journal, Advanced Synthesis & Catalysis.

Notable awards
Awards received by Buchwald include:
 2005 - CAS Science Spotlight Award
 2005 - Bristol-Myers Squibb Distinguished Achievement Award
 2006 – American Chemical Society Award for Creative Work in Synthetic Organic Chemistry
 2006 – Siegfried Medal Award in Chemical Methods which Impact Process Chemistry
 2010 – Gustavus J. Esselen Award for Chemistry in the Public Interest
 2013 – Arthur C. Cope Award
 2014 – Ulysses Medal, University College Dublin
 2014 – Linus Pauling Award
 2014 – BBVA Foundation Frontiers of Knowledge Award in Basic Sciences 
 2015 – Honorary Doctorate, University of South Florida
 2016 - William H. Nichols Medal
 2019 – Wolf Prize in Chemistry
 2019 – Roger Adams Award, American Chemical Society
 2020 – Clarivate Citation Laureate

References

External links

21st-century American chemists
Massachusetts Institute of Technology School of Science faculty
Living people
Harvard University alumni
Brown University alumni
1955 births
Organic chemists
California Institute of Technology fellows
Fellows of the American Academy of Arts and Sciences
Members of the United States National Academy of Sciences